Agromyces ulmi is a Gram-negative, aerobic, xylanolytic and non-motile bacterium from the genus of Agromyces which has been isolated from sawdust of the tree Ulmus nigra from Salamanca in Spain.

References 

Microbacteriaceae
Bacteria described in 2004